The Baltimore Washington International Turf Cup is an American Grade III invitational horse race run over one mile. Inaugurated in 1952, it was raced at Laurel Park Racecourse on the turf in Laurel, Maryland, at a distance of  miles (12 furlongs), and attracted top turf horses from North America and Europe.

It was held annually from 1952 to 1994, then it was discontinued because of its place on the late fall calendar and the popularity of the Breeders' Cup Turf. The race was brought back in 2005 as the Colonial Turf Cup run at Colonial Downs in Richmond, Virginia, and then at Laurel Park Racecourse as the Commonwealth Turf Cup in Laurel, Maryland, from 2015 to 2016. Then in 2017 the original root of race name was brought back as well adding it to a portion of its last version the Turf Cup suffix. So it is now being called the Baltimore Washington International Turf Cup.

When it was founded by John D. Schapiro (owner of the Laurel Park Racecourse), it was the only international horse race in the United States. Until then, bringing horses from Europe and elsewhere to the United States for a specific race was unprecedented. J. Samuel Pearlman, editor of the Daily Racing Form, discussed the idea with Schapiro after the 1950 racing season. Less than a year and half later, the concept became a reality.

Usually just called the International, the race drew the best Thoroughbreds from the U.S. and Europe; it was important enough to attract horses from the Soviet Union during the 1960s, despite the Cold War. In the 1980s, the Washington, D.C. International was part of a million-dollar bonus given to any horse who won both it, the Canadian International Stakes at Woodbine Racetrack in Toronto, and the Turf Classic at Belmont Park in New York.

In the race's early days, few American horses excelled on the turf; some were turf specialists, while others built their race records on the dirt and then specifically switched over to grass for the International. U.S. Hall of Famer Kelso won five straight Horse of the Year honors competing almost entirely on the dirt in the early 1960s and finished second three times in a row in the International. In 1964, the great gelding finally won the race in an American record time of 2:23.80. He had given the event international status in Europe by just missing three times, before winning it at age seven.

The Washington, D.C. International Stakes was raced at a distance of  miles from its inception in 1952 until 1986, when it was shortened to  miles. With the exception of 1993 (when it was raced at one mile), the International remained at  miles until its final running in 1994.

Run the Gantlet won the International in 1971; his son Providential won it in 1981. Providential was bred and previously owned by Bertram R. Firestone, whose wife Diana won the race the following year with her filly April Run after coming in second to Providential in 1981.

During its run, the D.C. International Stakes was won by horses from the United States 22 times and by foreign representatives 21 times.

Records
Speed  record:
 2:23.80 @ 1-1/2 miles: Kelso (1964) (stakes and track record)
 1:59.60 @ 1-1/4 miles: Paradise Creek (1994)
 1:52.98 @ 1-3/16 miles: Showing Up (2005)
 1:33.43 @ 1 mile: Blacktype  (2016)

Most wins by a horse:
 2 – Bald Eagle (1959, 1960)
 2 – Fort Marcy (1967, 1970)

Most wins by an owner:
 3 – Nelson Bunker Hunt (1973, 1975, 1976)

Most wins by a jockey:
 3 – Manuel Ycaza (1959, 1960, 1967)
 3 – Lester Piggott (1968, 1969, 1980)

Most wins by a trainer:
 4 – Maurice Zilber (1973, 1975, 1976, 1980)

Winners of the Baltimore Washington International Turf Cup since 1952

 * In 1958, Tudor Era finished first, but was disqualified and set back to second.

References 

Discontinued horse races
Laurel Park Racecourse
Horse races in Maryland
Turf races in the United States
Horse races established in 1952
Recurring events disestablished in 1995
1952 establishments in Washington, D.C.
1995 disestablishments in Washington, D.C.